Domino Foods, Inc. (also known as DFI and formerly known as W. & F.C. Havemeyer Company, Havemeyer, Townsend & Co. Refinery, and Domino Sugar) is a privately held sugar marketing and sales company based in Yonkers, New York, United States, that sells products produced by its manufacturing members.  DFI distributes sugar to retailers under four brand names across the U.S: Domino, C&H, Florida Crystals, and Redpath. Its namesake product, the Domino Sugar brand name, whose products are generally sold in two-tone packaging (white on top, yellow on bottom) with blue labeling text, is the best known. Domino Foods is the largest sugar company in the United States.

Domino Sugar has been a renowned brand in the United States east coast markets for more than 100 years. The brand name, Domino, was officially adopted in 1901 by a New York-based sugar company. Later, the distinctive yellow bags of Domino® Sugar became the highly recognizable packaging of granulated sugar. In recent years, the brand has expanded its portfolio of all-natural sweeteners to include agave nectar. Domino Foods owns three major U.S. refineries, located in Yonkers, New York; Baltimore, Maryland; and Chalmette, Louisiana, with a combined production capacity of 2.2 million metric tons of sugar per year.

History

In 1799, William Havemeyer, who had been an apprentice of a London sugar refiner, was hired by Edmund Seaman to manage his sugar refinery in New York City. His brother, Frederick Havemeyer, joined him in 1802. In 1807, the brothers opened their own sugar refining business called W. & F.C. Havemeyer Company on Vandam Street. In 1859, the business moved to the waterfront in Williamsburg, and changed its name to the Havemeyer, Townsend & Co. Refinery. The company processed slave-grown sugar canes. By 1864, the refinery was the most modern of its time. After a fire destroyed the refinery in 1882, the current plant was rebuilt and was the largest sugar refinery in the United States. After the Sugar Trust was ruled illegal in 1891, Henry Osborne Havemeyer and Theodore A. Havemeyer were elected as chairman and president, respectively, of the American Sugar Refining Company. In May 1896, American Sugar became one of the original 12 companies in the Dow Jones Industrial Average.

The company subsequently acquired five additional sugar refineries and changed its official name to "Domino Sugar" in 1900; the name change was officially recognized by the patent office on October 8, 1901. In 1916, Domino introduced individually wrapped sugar tablets.

In 1970, the American Sugar Company was renamed "The Amstar Corporation". In 1975, Amstar sued pizza chain Domino's Pizza for trademark infringement; Amstar won at trial but lost on appeal. Amstar was acquired by Kohlberg Kravis Roberts in 1983; KKR sold Amstar to Merrill Lynch three years later. Domino Sugar was acquired by British company Tate & Lyle in 1988.

In 2001, Domino Sugar officially changed its name to Domino Foods, Inc. The same year, Domino Foods was sold by Tate & Lyle to American Sugar Refining (owned by the Florida Crystals Corporation) and the Sugar Cane Growers Cooperative of Florida in a $180 million deal that was closed on November 6, 2001. Florida Crystals, a privately held company, is part of FLO-SUN, a sugar empire of the Fanjul Brothers whose origins trace to Spanish-Cuban sugar plantations of the early 19th century.

In 2009, Domino had its Domino Granulated Sugar and Florida Crystals brands certified as carbon neutral by the Carbonfund.org Foundation. It began including the foundation's CarbonFree partner logo on product packaging. The certification involved carbon offsets as well as changes to the production process. Some commentators noted in response that it was chemically impossible for sucrose to be free of carbon. The company issued a statement to clarify that "CarbonFree" referred to the production process rather than the product itself, and was not the same as the phrase "carbon free".

In 2012, Two Trees bought the Domino Sugar Refinery site in Williamsburg, Brooklyn, New York, for $185 million. In October 2014, several of the buildings at the site were demolished, including the Syrup Shed, the Wash House, the Turbine Room, the Power House, and the Pump House.

References

Additional references

External links

 

Sugar companies of the United States
Food production companies based in New York City
Companies based in Brooklyn
American companies established in 1807
Food and drink companies established in 1807
1807 establishments in New York (state)
Former components of the Dow Jones Industrial Average
2001 mergers and acquisitions